Sehat Sutardja (Se-hát Su-ta_ra ; born c. 1961 in Jakarta, Indonesia) is the co-founder of Marvell Technology Group; formerly chief executive officer and a director. Marvell is involved with industry segments including data storage, mobile and smart TVs.

Early life and education 
Sehat Sutardja was born in 1961 in Indonesia to a Chinese Indonesian family. His interest in electronics began early; he became a certified radio repair technician at age 13 and has been designing components and systems ever since.

Sutardja graduated from Canisius College, a high school in Jakarta in 1980. He came to the US in 1980 and received a Bachelor of Science degree in electrical engineering from Iowa State University. He also holds a Master of Science and Doctorate in electrical engineering and computer science from the University of California, Berkeley. While at Berkeley, Sutardja met his future wife Weili Dai in a campus elevator.

Career 
Sehat Sutardja worked at Micro Linear Corp. and Integrated Information Technology.
In 1995 he founded Marvell with his wife Weili Dai, and brother Pantas Sutardja, from his kitchen table.
Sutardja led Marvell since inception.

Sutardja has more than 440 patents and is a fellow of the Institute of Electrical and Electronics Engineers (IEEE). In 2004, Sutardja along with fellow Marvell co-founders Weili Dai and Pantas Sutardja received the Ernst & Young Entrepreneur of the Year award in the networking and communications category. In 2006, he was recognized as the Inventor of the Year by the Silicon Valley Intellectual Property Law Association.

In 2012, Sutardja was awarded the Indonesian Diaspora Lifetime Achievement Award for Global Pioneering and Innovation at the first-ever Congress of Indonesian Diaspora, presented by the Embassy of the Republic of Indonesia. In 2013, Sutardja was selected to join the Junior Achievement Business Hall of Fame. On Dec. 16, 2013, Marvell Co-founders Dr. Sehat Sutardja and Weili Dai were honored with the 2013 Dr. Morris Chang Exemplary Leadership Award  by the Global Semiconductor Alliance.
In 2004, Sutardja was and Award Recipient for the Northern California Region of the EY Entrepreneur of the Year Award. On July 21, 2015, Sutardja was named "Executive of the Year" by the annual ACE Awards. On April 4, 2016, Sutardja was removed from his position as CEO.

On April 5, 2016, Reuters reported that Sutardja, who was CEO of Marvell Technology Group, along with his wife, Weili Dai, the company's President, stepped down. Marvell said that an investigation found no fraud but that there was significant pressure from management on sales to meet revenue targets. The company's audit committee also pointed that some transactions revenue was booked prematurely due to internal controls that were not fully followed.

Causes and philanthropy 
Sutardja promotes new green energy efficiency standard for consumer electronics, working with both the U.S. and Chinese governments to establish efficiency performance standards that could produce significant cost and carbon savings. In 2010, he served as the principal founder of the Smart Electronics Initiative, a cross-industry collaborative campaign aimed at increasing awareness for the growing amount of energy consumed by everyday consumer electronics. Launched at Marvell with former Governor Arnold Schwarzenegger in cooperation with the Silicon Valley Leadership Group, the project focused on combatting the rising degree of energy dependence.

Sutardja has also been an active philanthropist, particularly in the areas of green technology and education. He and his wife, were early proponents of the One Laptop per Child program, providing the financial support and cutting-edge technology that has enabled the organization to give more than 2 million school-aged children new learning opportunities in developing countries around the world.

In March 2009, Berkeley named Sutardja Dai Hall in honor of the Marvell founders, who donated more than $20 million toward the establishment of the college's nano-fabrication laboratory; the building houses the Center for Information Technology Research in the Interest of Society (CITRIS).

Family 
Sehat Sutardja is married to Weili Dai and is the brother of Pantas Sutardja. All three are co-founders of Marvell and are Berkeley alumni. Dai is the former president of Marvell, and Pantas Sutardja is a former Marvell director.

Sehat Sutardja and Weili Dai have two children.

References

External links 
 Edward Robinson, Billionaires From Jakarta, Shanghai Undermined by U.S. Options, Bloomberg.com, May 21, 2007

1960s births
Living people
American people of Chinese-Indonesian descent
Indonesian people of Chinese descent
Indonesian emigrants to the United States
Iowa State University alumni
UC Berkeley College of Engineering alumni
University of California, Berkeley alumni
People from Jakarta
American businesspeople
Businesspeople in electronics